The 1943 Kentucky gubernatorial election was held on November 2, 1943. Republican nominee Simeon Willis defeated Democratic nominee J. Lyter Donaldson with 50.49% of the vote.

Primary elections
Primary elections were held on August 7, 1943.

Democratic primary

Candidates
J. Lyter Donaldson, former Kentucky Highway Commissioner
Ben Kilgore, former Executive Secretary of the Kentucky Farm Bureau 
Rodes K. Myers, incumbent Lieutenant Governor
John J. Thobe

Results

General election

Candidates
Major party candidates
Simeon Willis, Republican 
J. Lyter Donaldson, Democratic

Other candidates
Andrew N. Johnson, Prohibition

Results

References

1943
Gubernatorial
Kentucky